Wong Tai Sin or Huang Daxian is a Chinese Taoist deity popular in Jinhua, Zhejiang, and Hong Kong with the power of healing. The name, meaning the "Great Immortal Wong (Huang)", is the divine form of Huang Chuping or Wong Cho Ping (c. 328 – c. 386), a Taoist hermit from Jinhua during the Eastern Jin dynasty.

Legend

According to the text Self-Description of Chisongzi ("Master Red Pine"), Wong Tai Sin was born Huang Chuping (Wong Cho Ping in Cantonese) in 328 in Lanxi, Jinhua, Zhejiang province. Western sources have him listed at c. 284 to 364 CE.

Wong Cho Ping is said to have experienced poverty and hunger, becoming a shepherd when he was eight years old. He began practising Taoism at the age of fifteen after meeting an immortal or saintly person on Red Pine Mountain in his hometown. Legend has it that he was able to transform stones into sheep forty years later. Wong Tai Sin later became known as the Red Pine Immortal, after the mountain where he had his hermitage, and his birthday is celebrated on the 23rd of the eighth lunar month.

Influence in Hong Kong

Today, Sik Sik Yuen is an educational and charitable foundation that, true to Leung's origins as a healer, runs a free clinic and a number of schools and colleges. In Hong Kong, the Wong Tai Sin area and Wong Tai Sin district are named after the deity. There is also one MTR station that is named as Wong Tai Sin station. Many worshippers and tourists from all over the world visit Wong Tai Sin Temple everyday.

In popular culture
Adam Cheng has the role of the TVB's tv series, The Legend of Wong Tai Sin in the eighties.
Lam Ching Ying is another role for the movie of TVB's same title in 1992, depicting the life story of Wong Tai Sin.

See also
Xian (Taoism)
Shen (Chinese religion)

References

External links
 Sik Sik Yuen

 
Taoism in Hong Kong
Taoism in Guangdong
Health gods
328 births
386 deaths
People from Lanxi, Zhejiang
Liu Song dynasty people
Taoist immortals